The Advisor, TRAI is the head of different divisions in the Telecom Regulatory Authority of India (TRAI).The advisors are in the rank and pay of Joint Secretaries to Government of India. The advisors look into the ten functional divisions, namely Mobile Network, Interconnection & Fixed Network, BroadBand and Policy Analysis, Quality of Service, Broadcasting & Cable Services, Economic Regulation, Financial Analysis & IFA, Legal, Consumer Affairs & International Relation and RE & Administration & Personnel.Officers are selected from the premier Indian Administrative Service and Indian Revenue Service and also from the Indian Telecommunication Service as well as the Indian Economic Service.

Regional Offices
 
TRAI has also set up regional offices looking into the regulatory compliance matter in different regions in India.The Bangalore head office looks into regulatory compliance in Karnataka and Kerala.

See also
Union Council of Ministers of India
 Principal Secretary (India)

References

External links
Official Portal of the Indian Government

Indian civil servants
Indian Civil Services
Indian government officials
Ministry of Communications and Information Technology (India)
Telecommunications authorities of India